Tinamba is a dairy farming town in Victoria, Australia, located on Traralgon - Maffra Road between Heyfield and Maffra, in the Shire of Wellington. It has a country pub, a church, engineer works and two dilapidated tennis courts. In 2007 Tinamba suffered two 1 in 100-year floods. 
Tinamba Railway Station Post Office opened on 1 July 1887 and was renamed Tinamba around 1895.

See also
Tinamba railway station

References

Towns in Victoria (Australia)
Shire of Wellington